Boronia subulifolia is a plant in the citrus family Rutaceae and is endemic to a small area in south-eastern New South Wales in Australia. It is an erect, woody shrub with pinnate leaves with mostly linear leaflets, and light to deep pink, four-petalled flowers in the leaf axils or on the ends of the branches.

Description
The stigma is about the same width as the style.

Taxonomy and naming
Boronia subulifolia was first formally described in 1928 by Edwin Cheel and the description was published in Journal and Proceedings of the Royal Society of New South Wales. The specific epithet (subulifolia) is derived from  Latin word subula meaning "an awl" and folium meaning "a leaf", referring to the finely pointed leaflets.

Distribution and habitat
Boronia subulifolia grows in heath and woodland on rocky sandstone, mainly in the Budawang Range.

References 

subulifolia
Flora of New South Wales
Plants described in 1928
Taxa named by Edwin Cheel